N. R. Rengarajan is an Indian politician and incumbent Member of the Legislative Assembly of Tamil Nadu. He was elected to the Tamil Nadu legislative assembly as a Tamil Maanila Congress (Moopanar) candidate from Pattukkottai constituency in 2001 election, and as an Indian National Congress candidate in 2006, 2011 election. He was elected three times: 2001, 2006, 2011.

Electoral performance

References 

Indian National Congress politicians from Tamil Nadu
Living people
Year of birth missing (living people)
Tamil Nadu MLAs 2001–2006
Tamil Nadu MLAs 2006–2011
Tamil Nadu MLAs 2011–2016